Piya ke gaon (English: Lover's Village) is a Bhojpuri film, based on the same name directed by Dilip Bose. The film was released on 5 June 1985. It had music by Chitragupt and songs by Alka Yagnik, Suresh Wadkar and Chandrani Mukherjee. Dilip Bose is a screen play writer of this film. And It film marked by Minakashi production company.

Plot
This film shows the tragedy of a dowry system.

Cast

 Meera madhuri 
 Danisha
 Aruna Irani
 Jayshree (Actress)

Music
 Ae Dactar Babu Batain
 Aankh Mein Suratiya
 Hemar Piyava
 He Tripurari He
 Yug Yug Jiyasu Lalanwa
 Aankh Se Aankh Milke
 Pahile Pahile
 Ghir Aail Kariya Badariya
 Kanhwa Ke Tilak
 Chodi Ke Chalailu

See also 
 Bhojpuri Film Industry
 List of Bhojpuri films

References

1985 films
1980s Hindi-language films